British Agent is a 1934 American romantic espionage film directed by Michael Curtiz and starring Leslie Howard and Kay Francis. It is based on Memoirs of a British Agent, the 1932 autobiography of R. H. Bruce Lockhart, who worked for the British Secret Service during the Russian Revolution and had an affair with a Russian agent, later known as Moura Budberg. The film was produced by First National, then a division of Warner Bros.

Production
At one point, the studio considered the possibility of shooting some scenes on location in the Soviet Union, but the political situation there made that impossible. Instead, the film was shot at the studio in Hollywood, with sets designed by the art director Anton Grot. The comparatively-large budget of $475,000 allowed 41 different sets to be used to recreate Imperial Russia and the early years of the Revolution.

The same book was partly used as an inspiration for the television series Reilly, Ace of Spies, which also portrayed the adventures of Lockhart and Sidney Reilly during their years in Moscow around the time of the Russian Revolution.

Plot and Historical Basis
In the days leading up to the Russian Revolution, Stephen Locke, a minor British diplomat, watches rioting in the streets. The revolutionary Elena Moura shoots it out with a Cossack soldier. When she retreats onto the grounds of the consulate, the soldier follows, forcing Stephen to intervene to protect British extraterritoriality. After the Cossack leaves, Elena emerges; she and Steven are attracted to each other, but their politics clash. Elena departs.

After the Russian Empire is overthrown and the Soviet Union is born, most Western diplomats evacuate. Stephen is left behind with just a servant, "Poohbah" Evans. Day after day, he waits with mounting frustration for instructions, passing the time with others in the same situation, the American Bob Medill, Gaston LeFarge, and Tito Del Val.

His boredom is lifted when he meets Elena again. She is now an important member of the government, working for Commissioner of War Leo Trotsky. He romances her, and they quickly fall in love.

However, her first loyalty is to her country. She demonstrates that when Stephen finally receives orders from the United Kingdom. He is to try to prevent Soviet Russia from concluding a separate peace with Imperial Germany, which would free up large numbers of German soldiers for the Western Front, but he is warned that he is only an "unofficial" British representative. Stephen carelessly reads the message in Elena's hearing. She passes along the information to her boss. As a result, when Stephen pleads with the Soviet government in Moscow to keep fighting, his arguments are undercut by their awareness of his status. He manages to get a delay of three weeks to see if he can persuade his superiors to agree to Soviet demands: £50 million, five army divisions and munitions. Instead, without Stephen's knowledge, the British send a force to Archangel to fight alongside the internal enemies of the Soviets.

After the Tsar is executed, Medill, LeFarge and Del Val persuade Stephen to join them in supporting counterrevolutionary forces. When Vladimir Lenin is seriously wounded in an assassination attempt, the Soviets initiate a harsh crackdown. LeFarge and Del Val are killed while they attempt to contact a rebel military leader in the city. Medill tries to do the same, but is caught and tortured for Stephen's whereabouts. When he refuses to crack, he is sentenced to die by firing squad the next day.

Elena is ordered to persuade him to tell her where Stephen is; knowing that she is in love with Stephen, Medill gives her the address. She reluctantly gives the information to Trotsky, who orders soldiers to level the building. Elena sneaks into the building, as she is determined to die with Stephen. They are reprieved, however. Just as the soldiers start shooting, news arrives that Lenin will recover and that he has ordered the release of all political prisoners. Later, Stephen and Elena depart for Britain. At the train station, Medill requests they send him a supply of bubble gum.

Cast
 Leslie Howard as Stephen Locke
 Kay Francis as Elena Moura
 William Gargan as Bob Medill
 Phillip Reed as Gaston LeFarge
 Irving Pichel as Sergei Pavlov
 Ivan F. Simpson as "Poohbah" Evans (as Ivan Simpson)
 Halliwell Hobbes as Sir Walter Carrister
 J. Carroll Naish as Commissioner of War Trotsky 
 Walter Byron as Under Secretary Stanley
 Cesar Romero as Tito Del Val
 Arthur Aylesworth as Mr. Henry Farmer
 Alphonse Ethier as Paul DeVigney
 Frank Reicher as Mr. X
 Tenen Holtz as Lenin
 Doris Lloyd as Lady Carrister
 Mary Forbes as Lady Catherine Trehearne
 Marina Schubert as Maria Nikolaievna 
 George C. Pearce as Lloyd George 
 Gregory Gaye as Mr. Kolinoff
 Herbert Bunston as Cabinet Member (uncredited)
 Olaf Hytten as Under Secretary Avery (uncredited) 
 Joseph Mario as Stalin (uncredited)

References

External links 
 
 
 
 
 British Agent on Lux Radio Theater: June 7, 1937

1934 films
American spy films
1930s English-language films
Films based on biographies
Films directed by Michael Curtiz
Films scored by Heinz Roemheld
1934 romantic drama films
1930s spy films
Russian Revolution films
American war drama films
Cultural depictions of Leon Trotsky
American romantic drama films
Warner Bros. films
American black-and-white films
Films set in London
Films set in Saint Petersburg
1930s war drama films
1930s American films
Films scored by Bernhard Kaun
Films about diplomats